Graham Charles Kingston (1 November 1950) is a former Welsh cricketer.  Kingston was a right-handed batsman who bowled right-arm medium pace.  He was born at Newport, Monmouthshire.

Kingston made his first-class debut for Glamorgan aged 16, in the 1967 County Championship against Worcestershire.  From 1967 to 1971, he represented the county in 9 first-class matches, with his final first-class appearance for the county coming against Oxford University.  In his 9 first-class matches he scored 161 runs at a batting average of 12.38, with a high score of 26.  With the ball, he took just 4 wickets at a bowling average of 52.50, with best figures of 2/18.

Kingston also played List-A cricket for Glamorgan, making his List-A debut for the county in the 1968 Gillette Cup against Northamptonshire.  From 1968 to 1970, he represented the county in 13 List-A matches, with his final List-A appearance coming in 1970 against Hampshire.  In his 13 List-A matches, he took 19 wickets at an average of 14.57, with a single five wicket haul which yielded him best figures of 6/36 against Derbyshire in the 1969 John Player League.  Kingston left the Glamorgan staff at the end of the 1971 season.

After leaving Glamorgan he worked as a real estate agent in Newport.

References

External links
Graham Kingston at Cricinfo
Graham Kingston at CricketArchive

1950 births
Living people
Sportspeople from Newport, Wales
Welsh cricketers
Glamorgan cricketers